Lopacinskiai Palace is a building in Vilnius Old Town, Bernardinai st. Currently it is hotel "Šekspyras".

History 
In the first half of the 18th century Mikołaj Tadeusz Łopaciński purchased the building and converted it into Palace with Johann Christoph Glaubitz project. In 1801, the Palace was sold to Kossakowski. In 1808, minor reconstruction was made to adapt the Palace with city road contour.

In 1819–1828, earl Olizaras family owned the Palace. After them it was owned by printers Zavadskai, who used it as printing house. In 1967–1975, main hull was partly reconstructed with architect Aldona Svabauskienė project.

Currently it is hotel "Šekspyras".

References

External links 
 Hotel "Šekspyras"

Palaces in Vilnius
Łopaciński family